Bhoomika is a 1991 Indian Malayalam film, directed by I. V. Sasi and produced by John Paul and M. G. Soman. The film stars Jayaram, Suresh Gopi, Sai Kumar, Mukesh and Urvashi in the lead roles. The film has musical score by Raveendran.

Cast

Jayaram as Unnikrishnan
Suresh Gopi as Gopi
Sai Kumar as Ravi
Mukesh as Chandikkunju
Urvashi as Radha
Ragasudha as Raji
M. G. Soman as Raghavan
Nedumudi Venu as Rama Warrier
Karamana Janardanan Nair as Memana Madhava Panikkar
Rizabawa as Rameshan
Ramu as Dineshan
Jagathi Sreekumar as Kuttappan
Sabitha Anand as Sarada
Mala Aravindan as Rappayi
Innocent as Sivan Pillai
Kanakalatha as Yasodhamma
Sankaradi
Jagannatha Varma
KPAC Sunny
Kuthiravattam Pappu
Ravi Menon
 Kuttettan as Young Gopi

Soundtrack
The music was composed by Raveendran.

References

External links
 
 

1991 films
1990s Malayalam-language films
Films directed by I. V. Sasi